Sara Eriksson may refer to:
 Sara Eriksson (handballer) (born 1981), Swedish handballer
 Sara Eriksson (wrestler) (born 1974), Swedish wrestler

See also
 Sara Erikson, American actress